Stavrodromi is a village  and a community of the Voio municipality. Before the 2011 local government reform it was part of the municipality of Tsotyli, of which it was a municipal district. The 2011 census recorded 70 inhabitants in the village.

See also
 List of settlements in the Kozani regional unit

References

Populated places in Kozani (regional unit)